Mariana Cadena Calvillo (born 13 February 1995) is a Mexican professional footballer who plays as a centre back for Liga MX Femenil club CF Monterrey. She is also a member of the Mexico women's national team.

International career
Cadena debuted for the Mexico national team in a 2017 friendly against Venezuela.

References

External links 
 

1995 births
Living people
Women's association football central defenders
Mexican women's footballers
Footballers from Nuevo León
Sportspeople from Monterrey
Mexico women's international footballers
Liga MX Femenil players
C.F. Monterrey (women) players
Mexican footballers